Nasbandi is a 1978 Bollywood satirical film directed by I. S. Johar, it starred duplicates of all the popular heroes of the time. It is a satire on the sterilization drive of the government of India during Indira Gandhi ruling period. Each character in the film is trying to find sterilization cases.

The film was banned after its release due to its portrayal of the Indira Gandhi government and its policy of compulsory sterilization during the emergency period. Later, however, the film achieved cult popularity via home video and satellite broadcast (the ban was lifted after the change of regime).

Cast

The cast included:

Anitav Bacchan as Amitabh Bachchan
Kannauj Kumar as Manoj Kumar
Shahi Kapoor as Shashi Kapoor
Rakesh Khanna as Rajesh Khanna
Shivanand as Sevanand
Shatru Bin Sinha as Shatru Mehra
Ambika Johar as Monica
Anwar Hussain as Superintendent of Police
Rajendra Nath (credited as Rajinder Nath) as Rajendra Nath
Anil Johar
Leela Mishra (credited as Leela Misra) as Foster Mother
I. S. Johar as himself
Jeevan as Raosab Banwari Lal 
Hiralal (credited as Hira Lal) as Prosecuting Lawyer
Manorama as Rehana Begum
Tuntun as Tonica

Soundtrack
 "Jab Se Sarkar Ne Nasbandi" - Various
 "Gandhi Tere Desh Mein Ye Kaisa Atyachar" - Kishore Kumar
 "Kya Mil Gaya Sarkar Emergency Laga Ke" - Mahendra Kapoor, Manna Dey
 "Kiski Chali Hai Kiski Chali Hai" - Amit Kumar, Nitin Mukesh
 "Prabhu Ji Dedo Ek Santaan"
 "Begunahon Ka Lahoo"
 "Dama Dam Mast Qalandar" - Amit Kumar, Nitin Mukesh
 "Koi Khanjar Se"...  Hamein Tau Maar Diya Kasti Topi Walon Ne - Usha Timothy, Anuradha Paudwal
 "Prabhuji De Do" - Anuradha Paudwal
 "Kis Daam Pe" - Lata Mangeshkar
 "Kahan Gayi"  - Kishore Kumar

References

External links
 
 

1978 films
1970s Hindi-language films
Films scored by Kalyanji Anandji
Indian satirical films
Censorship in India
Works about the Emergency (India)
Sterilization in fiction
Birth control in India